The Tucson Mountains are a minor mountain range west of Tucson, Arizona, United States.  The Tucson Mountains, including Wasson Peak, are one of four notable mountain ranges surrounding the Tucson Basin.  The Santa Catalina Mountains lie to the northeast, the Rincon Mountains are to the east of Tucson, and the Santa Rita Mountains lie to the south. Additionally, the Sierrita Mountains lie due south, the Roskruge Mountains lie to the west across Avra Valley, the Silver Bell Mountains lie to the northwest, and the Tortolita Mountains lie to the north across the Santa Cruz Valley.

Parks and preserves
The Arizona-Sonora Desert Museum is located on the west flank of the Tucson Mountains. Much of the range is protected by Saguaro National Park and Tucson Mountain County Park. Old Tucson Studios are located just west of the Tucson Mountains.

Tucson Mountain Park was established in April 1929. The Pima County Parks Commission, with C. B. Brown as its chairman, was established to oversee the park. The area is popular with hikers, mountain bikers, and equestrians.

Saguaro National Park was created as a national monument in 1933 and later designated a national park in 1994. Common wildlife include the coyote, Gambel's quail, and desert tortoise.

According to historian David Leighton, Brown Mountain in Tucson Mountain Park is named in honor of park founder, C.B. Brown; Kinney Road, the main thoroughfare in the park is, named for Pima County Supervisor, Jack C. Kinney who worked with Brown in the creation of the park and McCain Loop was named for J.C. McCain, the first park ranger.

Gallery

See also

 Madrean Sky Islands

References

External links

 Tucson Mountain Park official site
  David Leighton, "Street Smarts: Successful cattleman the namesake for Kinney Road," Arizona Daily Star, April 22, 2014

Geography of Tucson, Arizona
Mountain ranges of Pima County, Arizona
Mountain ranges of the Sonoran Desert
Mountain ranges of Arizona